The year 2008 is the 8th year in the history of Deep, a mixed martial arts promotion based in Japan. In 2008 Deep held 27 events beginning with, Deep: 28 Impact.

Title fights

Events list

Deep: Future King Tournament 2007

Deep: Future King Tournament 2007 was an event held on January 14, 2008, at Shinjuku Face in Tokyo.

Results

Deep: Kobudo Fight 2

Deep: Kobudo Fight 2 was an event held on February 17, 2008, at Kobudo Martial Arts Communication Space Tiger Hall in Nagoya.

Results

Deep: 34 Impact

Deep: 34 Impact was an event held on February 22, 2008, at Korakuen Hall in Tokyo.

Results

Deep: clubDeep Tokyo

Deep: clubDeep Tokyo was an event held on March 29, 2008, at Shinjuku Face in Tokyo.

Results

Deep: Megaton Grand Prix 2008 Opening Round

Deep: Megaton Grand Prix 2008 Opening Round was an event held on March 29, 2008, at Shinjuku Face in Tokyo.

Results

Deep: Kobudo Fight 3

Deep: Kobudo Fight 3 was an event held on April 20, 2008, at Kobudo Martial Arts Communication Space Tiger Hall in Nagoya.

Results

Deep: 35 Impact

Deep: 35 Impact was an event held on May 19, 2008, at Korakuen Hall in Tokyo.

Results

Deep: Megaton Grand Prix 2008 Semifinal

Deep: Megaton Grand Prix 2008 Semifinal was an event held on May 24, 2008, at Shinjuku Face in Tokyo.

Results

Deep: clubDeep Tokyo

Deep: clubDeep Tokyo was an event held on May 24, 2008, at Shinjuku Face in Tokyo.

Results

Deep: clubDeep Toyama: Barbarian Festival 7

Deep: clubDeep Toyama: Barbarian Festival 7 was an event held on June 1, 2008, at The Toyama Event Plaza in Toyama.

Results

Deep: Glove 2

Deep: Glove 2 was an event held on June 15, 2008, at Shinjuku Face in Tokyo.

Results

Deep: clubDeep Nagoya: MB3z Impact, All Stand Up

Deep: clubDeep Nagoya: MB3z Impact, All Stand Up was an event held on June 29, 2008, at Zepp Nagoya in Nagoya.

Results

Deep: 36 Impact

Deep: 36 Impact was an event held on July 27, 2008, at Zepp Osaka in Osaka.

Results

Deep: Megaton Grand Prix 2008 Finals

Deep: Megaton Grand Prix 2008 Finals was an event held on August 2, 2008, at Shinjuku Face in Tokyo.

Results

Deep: Gladiator

Deep: Gladiator was an event held on August 16, 2008, at Momotaro Arena in Okayama.

Results

Deep: 37 Impact

Deep: 37 Impact was an event held on August 17, 2008, at Korakuen Hall in Tokyo.

Results

Deep: clubDeep Kyoto

Deep: clubDeep Kyoto was an event held on August 30, 2008, at Terrsa Hall in Kyoto.

Results

Deep: Kobudo Fight 4

Deep: Kobudo Fight 4 was an event held on September 13, 2008, at Kobudo Martial Arts Communication Space Tiger Hall in Nagoya.

Results

Deep: Glove 3

Deep: Glove 3 was an event held on September 20, 2008, at Shinjuku Face in Tokyo.

Results

Deep: Glove Amateur

Deep: Glove Amateur was an event held on September 20, 2008, at Shinjuku Face in Tokyo.

Results

Deep: clubDeep Hamamatsu

Deep: clubDeep Hamamatsu was an event held on September 28, 2008, at Act City in Hamamatsu.

Results

Deep: 38 Impact

Deep: 38 Impact was an event held on October 23, 2008, at Korakuen Hall in Tokyo.

Results

Deep: Kobudo Fight 5

Deep: Kobudo Fight 5 was an event held on November 30, 2008, at Kobudo Martial Arts Communication Space Tiger Hall in Nagoya.

Results

Deep: Double Impact

Deep: Double Impact was an event held on December 6, 2008, at Osaka Prefectural Gymnasium in Osaka.

Results

Deep: 39 Impact

Deep: 39 Impact was an event held on December 10, 2008, at Korakuen Hall in Tokyo.

Results

Deep: Protect Impact 2008

Deep: Protect Impact 2008 was an event held on December 22, 2008, at Shinjuku Face in Tokyo.

Results

Deep: Future King Tournament 2008

Deep: Future King Tournament 2008 was an event held on December 28, 2008, at Gold's Gym South Tokyo Annex in Tokyo.

Results

See also 
 List of Deep champions
 List of Deep events

References

Deep (mixed martial arts) events
2008 in mixed martial arts